Hanne Bjurstrøm (born 20 September 1960) is a Norwegian lawyer and politician representing the Labour Party, who served as Gender Equality and Anti-Discrimination Ombud from 2016 to 2022. She previously served as Minister of Labour and Social Inclusion in Stoltenberg's Second Cabinet from 2009 to 2012. In 2021 she became vice president of the Labour Court of Norway.

Career
Prior to entering the cabinet, she was a special adviser in the Ministry of Climate and Environment and served as the Norwegian chief negotiator at the United Nations Climate Change Conference in 2009. She has formerly also worked at the Ministry of Justice and Public Security and the Office of the Attorney General of Norway, and as a corporate lawyer. After leaving the cabinet, she became a partner in the corporate law firm Arntzen de Besche.

Minister of Labour and Social Inclusion
Rigmor Aasrud acted as minister of labour from when Stoltenberg reshuffled his cabinet on 20 October 2009, until Bjurstrøm assumed office on 21 December.

Ombudsman of Gender Equality and Anti-discrimination
She was appointed by the King-in-Council as Gender Equality and Anti-Discrimination Ombud on 23 October 2015 and took office on 18 January 2016.

References

1960 births
Government ministers of Norway
Labor ministers
Living people
Labour Party (Norway) politicians
Women government ministers of Norway